The City of Timișoara Stadium is a proposed soccer-specific stadium in Timișoara, Romania. If completed, it will replace Dan Păltinișanu Stadium.

Project 
The idea of building a new stadium appeared in 2015, when Nicolae Robu, the former mayor of Timișoara, presented a master plan that provided for the restructuring of the area known as Olimpia by building a 40,000-seat stadium, an Olympic-size swimming pool, a multi-purpose sports hall, a hotel and a velodrome. The old Dan Păltinișanu Stadium was in an advanced state of degradation, some parts of the grandstands being closed to the public, and a possible renovation was not justified given the high costs. The master plan was presented at the 19th International Trade Fair for Property and Investment, held at Messe München Exhibition Center in October 2016.

The technical project of the future stadium began in January 2021, and the feasibility study was approved by the county councilors in June 2021. According to the study, the seating capacity will be 30,000, and the construction costs will amount to 122 million euros, of which 11 million will be borne by the Timiș County Council. Moreover, it will be uncovered so that it can also host cultural or entertainment events. The project's deadline is 2025. Initially, Alin Nica, the president of the Timiș County Council, proposed the construction of an athletics track around the stadium, but the idea was quickly rejected by the representatives of the city's football galleries.

See also 
 Stadionul Dan Păltinișanu
 List of football stadiums in Romania 
 List of European stadia by capacity
 List of future stadiums

References 

 
Proposed stadiums 
Sports venues in Romania 
Proposed buildings and structures in Romania